Queen City is an unincorporated community in Sierra County, California, United States.

References

Unincorporated communities in Sierra County, California
Unincorporated communities in California